The Debut is a studio album by Jackie Evancho, consisting of 10 tracks. The album was released on April 12, 2019, on Evancho's independent JE Touring label.

The tracks concentrate on songs from 21st century Broadway musicals and musical films. The album was produced by Michael Mangini. Evancho began a U.S. tour in April 2019 to promote The Debut and promoted the album on various media, including Yahoo! Finance and Good Morning America.

The album was Evancho's eighth consecutive release on the Billboard Classical Albums chart to reach No. 1.

Development and production 
Evancho said of the genesis of the album, 
I wanted The Debut to sort of be the new American Songbook, so that required looking into these newer Broadway shows. … I was trying to find a way that I could break into a younger demographic, but not neglect [the older] fans that I do have. I was looking into Broadway shows that a lot of older [fans] love, and I was seeing that there were a lot of younger people adoring the soundtracks, especially Hamilton. And I thought, well this would be a perfect idea for me to really delve into that world and see if I can merge the young and the old demos. And I fell in love with the music and the characters and the plays, everything about it.

The album was produced by Michael Mangini and recorded at Mission Sound & Mojo Music, Brooklyn, New York. The MUSA Prague orchestra was conducted by Richard Hein. Piano and keyboards on the album were played by Jorn Swart, who became Evancho's music director for her subsequent tour, drums and percussion were played by Jake Goldbas, bass was played by Leon Boykins, and guitars and mandolin were played by Dylan Kondor. It was mastered by Chris Gehringer at Sterling Sound Studios; the executive producer was Cathleen Murphy.

Release and promotion 
In February 2019, Evancho released her cover of "Somewhere" as a YouTube video (audio) and performed the song on the finale of America's Got Talent: The Champions. On April 10, she released a music video of "Burn" on YouTube, and on April 12, 2019, she released The Debut.

Evancho began a U.S. tour in April 2019 to promote The Debut, with a concert at Feinstein's/54 Below in New York City. She also promoted the album on various media, including Yahoo! Finance and Good Morning America, often singing "Burn".

Track listing 
Source: Liner notes

Charts

References

External links 
"Burn" music video
Evancho interview about the album

Jackie Evancho albums
2019 albums
Covers albums
Self-released albums